Lynley Hood (born 1942) is an author from New Zealand.

Biography 
Hood was born in 1942 in Hamilton, New Zealand. She has an MSc in Physiology, and LittD from University of Otago. She currently lives in Dunedin.

Hood worked in medical research until 1979, after which she worked as a freelance writer. She has published a number of biographies and non-fiction works. She has also been published in New Zealand Books, the Otago Daily Times, the New Zealand Listener, New Zealand Author, and North & South.

Selected works
 Sylvia! The Biography of Sylvia Ashton-Warner (1989), a biography of author Sylvia Ashton-Warner
 Who is Sylvia? The Diary of a Biography (1990)
 Minnie Dean: Her Life & Crimes (1994), a biography of Minnie Dean, the only woman to receive the death penalty in New Zealand
 City Possessed: The Christchurch Civic Crèche Case (2001)

Awards 
Sylvia! The Biography of Sylvia Ashton-Warner won first prize at the 1980 Goodman Fielder Wattie Book Awards. It also won the 1989 PEN Best First Book of Prose Award and 1990 Talking Book of the Year.

Minnie Dean: Her Life & Crimes was a finest in the 1995 New Zealand Book Awards.

In 2002, City Possessed: The Christchurch Civic Creche Case won the Readers' Choice Award and the Montana Medal for Non-Fiction at the Montana New Zealand Book Awards. It also won the 2002 NZ Skeptics Bravo Award.

Hood received the 1991 Robert Burns Fellowship.

References

External links 
 Official website

Living people
1942 births
Writers from Dunedin
People from Hamilton, New Zealand
University of Otago alumni
New Zealand biographers
New Zealand women writers
Women biographers